Salaria atlantica is a species of combtooth blenny from the subfamily Salarinae, the largest of the two subfamilies in the Family Blenniidae. It is a freshwater species which is restricted to Ouerrha River which is part of the Sebou River basin, in Morocco. It is found in shallow, flowing streams with a  stony substrate.

References

atlantica
Fish described in 2011